XHTOR-FM is a public radio station on 96.3 FM in Torreón, Coahuila. The station is owned by the municipality of Torreón and known as Radio Torreón.

History
XHTOR began operations on April 30, 1991. It was among the first noncommercial stations in the Comarca Lagunera.

References

Radio stations in Coahuila
Radio stations in the Comarca Lagunera
Radio stations established in 1991
Public radio in Mexico